Elwood is a city in Doniphan County, Kansas, United States, located west across the Missouri River from Saint Joseph, Missouri.  As of the 2020 census, the population of the city was 1,125.

History
A trading post was established at Elwood in 1852. In 1856, the site was sold and the town was then laid out. The town was named for John B. Elwood, a pioneer settler. Elwood was incorporated as a city in 1860.

The first post office in Elwood was established in June, 1857.

Geography
Elwood is located at  (39.753544, -94.878345).

Climate

Demographics

Elwood is part of the St. Joseph, MO–KS Metropolitan Statistical Area.

2010 census
As of the census of 2010, there were 1,224 people, 498 households, and 331 families living in the city. The racial makeup of the city was 87.1% White, 6.7% African American, 0.9% Native American, 0.2% Asian, 1.0% from other races, and 4.2% from two or more races. Hispanic or Latino of any race were 4.4% of the population.

There were 498 households, of which 32.3% had children under the age of 18 living with them, 46.4% were married couples living together, 15.1% had a female householder with no husband present, 5.0% had a male householder with no wife present, and 33.5% were non-families. 28.9% of all households were made up of individuals, and 10% had someone living alone who was 65 years of age or older. The average household size was 2.46 and the average family size was 3.00.

The median age in the city was 36.7 years. 25.1% of residents were under the age of 18; 10.3% were between the ages of 18 and 24; 24.6% were from 25 to 44; 27.2% were from 45 to 64; and 12.9% were 65 years of age or older. The gender makeup of the city was 50.1% male and 49.9% female.

2000 census
As of the census of 2000, there were 1,145 people, 446 households, and 313 families living in the city. The racial makeup of the city was 89.08% White, 6.64% African American, 0.26% Native American, 0.44% Asian, 0.35% from other races, and 3.23% from two or more races. Hispanic or Latino of any race were 1.48% of the population.

There were 446 households, out of which 37.9% had children under the age of 18 living with them, 49.3% were married couples living together, 15.9% had a female householder with no husband present, and 29.8% were non-families. 25.8% of all households were made up of individuals, and 10.8% had someone living alone who was 65 years of age or older. The average household size was 2.57 and the average family size was 3.07.

In the city, the population was spread out, with 30.9% under the age of 18, 10.2% from 18 to 24, 27.0% from 25 to 44, 20.7% from 45 to 64, and 11.2% who were 65 years of age or older. The median age was 32 years. For every 100 females, there were 98.4 males. For every 100 females age 18 and over, there were 88.8 males.

The median income for a household in the city was $28,950, and the median income for a family was $31,136. Males had a median income of $26,103 versus $17,692 for females. The per capita income for the city was $12,601. About 16.3% of families and 17.0% of the population were below the poverty line, including 21.1% of those under age 18 and 17.9% of those age 65 or over.

Education
The community is served by Riverside USD 114 public school district. School unification consolidated Elwood schools and Wathena schools forming USD 114. The Riverside High School mascot is Cyclones.

Elwood High School closed through school unification. The Elwood High School mascot was Elwood Panthers.

References

Further reading

External links
 Elwood - Directory of Public Officials
 Elwood city map, KDOT

Cities in Kansas
Cities in Doniphan County, Kansas
St. Joseph, Missouri metropolitan area
Pony Express stations
Kansas populated places on the Missouri River
1852 establishments in Indian Territory